Gary Michael Karr (born November 20, 1941 in Los Angeles) is an American classical double bass virtuoso and teacher; he is considered one of the best bassists of the 20th and 21st centuries.

Biography 
Although he comes from several generations of bassists, he was not encouraged by them to go into music.  In an interview with ActiveBass magazine he said that he has no contact with the professional bassists in his family.

After attending Fairfax High School and USC, Karr studied at the Aspen Music Festival and the Juilliard School, where his major teachers included Herman Reinshagen and Stuart Sankey. Karr's breakthrough came in 1962, when he was featured as a soloist in a nationally televised New York Philharmonic Young People's Concert, conducted by Leonard Bernstein.  On that famous telecast, Karr performed "The Swan" from The Carnival of the Animals by Camille Saint-Saëns. Karr also recorded the piece with Bernstein and the New York Philharmonic.

He has since appeared as a soloist with the Chicago Symphony Orchestra, London Symphony Orchestra, London Philharmonic Orchestra, Montreal Symphony Orchestra, Hong Kong Philharmonic, Simon Bolivar Orchestra, Jerusalem Symphony, Oslo Philharmonic, Zurich Chamber Orchestra, and with all the major orchestras of Australia.

He has premiered new works written for him by Vittorio Giannini (Psalm CXX), Alec Wilder (Sonata for Double Bass and Piano and Suite for Double Bass and Guitar), Robert Xavier Rodriguez (Ursa, Four Seasons for Double Bass and Orchestra), and the concertos for double bass and orchestra by Gunther Schuller, Hans Werner Henze, John Downey and Ketil Hvoslef. He has recorded the Serge Koussevitzky concerto with Oslo Philharmonic.

He has taught double bass on the faculties of the Juilliard School, New England Conservatory of Music, The Hartt School, Yale University, Indiana University, University of North Carolina School of the Arts, and the Halifax (Nova Scotia) Schools Music Program and has published a number of instructional books for the double bass.  He focuses on finding one's unique sound on the double bass and approaching playing with the lyrical emphasis of a singer.

After 40 years as a concert artist he retired in 2001 to Victoria, British Columbia, where he lives with his dog Shin-Ju. And his dear friend and companion, fellow musician Harmon Lewis.

Foundations 
In 1967 Karr founded the International Society of Bassists (ISB), an organization devoted to the study, promotion, and advancement of double bass playing around the world. The ISB, with a membership of more than 3,000 double bass performers, teachers, students, and aficionados in more than 40 countries, hosts an international conference biannually to further these goals.

Karr was featured in two BBC documentaries; The Great Double Bass Race in 1978, and Amazing Bass in 1984.

In 2005, Karr donated his primary instrument, the Karr-Koussevitzky bass, to the ISB.  This instrument was given to Karr by Olga Koussevitzky, widow of Serge Koussevitzky, in 1961.  It is the intention of the ISB to make this valuable instrument available for use by double bassists worldwide.   The Karr-Koussevitzky bass was once believed to have been made by the Amati family and hence it is also referred to as the Amati bass.

The non-profit Karr Double Bass Foundation, which loans instruments to promising young double bassists to assist in their professional development, was established by Karr in 1984.

References

External links
Gary Karr Official website
International Society of Bassists Official website
Karr Doublebass Foundation Official website
Interview with Gary Karr by Bruce Duffie, December 13, 1993

1941 births
Living people
American classical double-bassists
Male double-bassists
Aspen Music Festival and School alumni
Musicians from Los Angeles
Juilliard School alumni
Juilliard School faculty
University of Hartford Hartt School faculty
Yale School of Music faculty
New England Conservatory faculty
Jacobs School of Music faculty
North Carolina School of the Arts faculty
Classical musicians from California
21st-century double-bassists
21st-century American male musicians